Neubauer v. Germany was a 2020 court case in which a group of activists sued over the vagueness present in 2019's Climate Protection Act.

Background 
Activists backed by Fridays For Future, Greenpeace, Friends of the Earth, and other NGOs brought claimed that the lack of a comprehensive legal framework to reduce carbon emissions by 2030 violated their fundamental rights as enshrined in German basic law. The complaint specifically called out that the state had to protect the right to life, personal freedom, right to property, and human dignity.

Decision 
The Constitutional Court declared part of the Federal Climate Protection Act unconstitutional, as it did not "sufficiently protect people against future infringements and limitations of freedom rights in the wake of gradually intensifying climate change". It ruled against some of their claims, saying the plaintiffs could not prove the government violated its consituitional duty.

The finance minister responded to the ruling by saying that he would work with the environment ministry to amend the act. The environmental minister wrote that she would present new climate proposals over the summer.

References 

Climate change litigation
Environmental issues in Germany
2021 in Germany
2021 in the environment
2015 in case law
German case law